Nöteborg may refer to:
 The Swedish name for Shlisselburg, a town in Kirovsky District of Leningrad Oblast, Russia
 Battle of Nöteborg, 1702, one of the first sieges of the Great Northern War, when Russian forces captured the Swedish fortress of Nöteborg
 Siege of Nöteborg, 1656, a siege during the Russo-Swedish War (1656–58)
 Treaty of Nöteborg, 1323, a peace treaty signed at Orekhovets (Swedish: Nöteborg); the first settlement between Sweden and Novgorod Republic regulating their border